Amelia E. Shevenell is an American marine geologist who specializes in high-latitude paleoclimatology and paleoceanography. She is currently an Associate Professor in the College of Marine Science at the University of South Florida. She has made notable contributions to understanding the history of the Antarctic ice sheets and published in high-impact journals and, as a result, was awarded full membership of Sigma Xi. She has a long record of participation in international ocean drilling programs and has served in leadership positions of these organizations. Shevenell is the elected Geological Oceanography Council Member for The Oceanography Society (2019-2021).

Early life and education 
Shevenell earned a bachelor's degree in Geology and Studio Art at Hamilton College in New York State. Shevenell worked as a laboratory technician and environmental scientist in Juneau, Alaska, before attending the University of California, Santa Barbara, where she studied Antarctic ice sheet evolution and paleoceanography and earned her Ph.D. in Marine Science (2004). Shevenell was a postdoctoral fellow at the Program on Climate Change at the University of Washington School of Oceanography. From 2007–2011, Shevenell was a lecturer in Earth Sciences and Geography at University College London. In 2011, Shevenell joined the faculty of the University of South Florida College of Marine Science, earning tenure in 2017.

Career and impact 
Amelia Shevenell's research is aimed at the evolution of Antarctica's ice sheets over the last 65 million years. Shevenell uses the sedimentological, geochemical, and micropaleontological properties of marine sediments from the deep-sea and Antarctica's continental margins to reconstruct relationships between Antarctica's ice sheets and Earth's oceans, carbon cycle, and climate on million - to decadal timescales. Shevenell's research is relevant to Intergovernmental Panel on Climate Change (IPCC) concerns that ongoing oceanic and atmospheric warming is accelerating polar ice cap melting and global sea level rise. She has participated in eight oceanographic expeditions to the Southern Ocean, several of which are featured in her scientific blogs.

Antarctic ice sheet development during the Cenozoic. Shevenell's research  has focused on Antarctic ice sheet development in the Miocene when a spurt of expansion occurred. Her work discovered that Southern Ocean cooling during the Middle Miocene Climate Transition occurred before the expansion of Antarctica's ice sheets at ~14 million years ago. Shevenell has since shown that progressive ice sheet expansion on Antarctica began around 16 million years ago, during the Miocene Climatic Optimum, when average global temperatures were warmer than present. Ice growth was paced by changes the eccentricity of Earth's orbit around the sun. Another study established that glaciers reached the Sabrina Coast of East Antarctica by at least the late Paleocene to early Eocene. This finding was counter to earlier studies that placed the beginning of ice expansion in Antarctica at the start of the Oligocene roughly 34 million years ago.

Carbon cycling in high-latitude oceans. In a study of Holocene marine sediments in the western Pacific Shevenell found evidence for increased upwelling in the North Pacific. The increased upwelling was caused by stronger winds, which in turn released more CO2 into the atmosphere enhancing global warming during the Holocene and the shrinkage of ice sheets. Thus, demonstrating that a possible cause of the warming was a change in ocean circulation.

Holocene ocean temperature and climate evolution of the western Antarctic Peninsula.  TEX86 proxy analysis of sediments from the western Antarctic Peninsula continental shelf documented the changing influence of warm Circumpolar Deep Water on regional glacier and sea ice extent since the last deglaciation, ~13,000 years ago. Cooling rather than warming occurred, driven by changes in local solar irradiance associated with changes in Earth's orbit. At present, atmospheric connections to the tropical Pacific allow warm ocean waters to move onto Antarctica's continental shelves, melting regional glaciers. Shevenell's research indicates this process has occurred in past warm climate intervals, and will likely continue as Earth's climate continues to warm.

Participation in scientific ocean drilling. Shevenell is involved in scientific ocean drilling and has worked both as an onshore laboratory scientist and twice as a shipboard scientist on seven Ocean Drilling Program/International Ocean Discovery Program (ODP/IODP) expeditions. She participated as a sedimentologist on ODP Leg 189 to the South Tasman Rise. This expedition tested the hypothesis Antarctic Ice Sheets developed in association with the development of the Southern Ocean and the Antarctic Circumpolar Current. Shevenell led the sedimentology group on IODP Expedition 374 to the central Ross Sea, Antarctica. This Expedition was designed to understand the factors influencing ice sheet development over the last 20 million years including the formation and history of the West Antarctic Ice Sheet.

Shevenell has also served within the leadership of the IODP Scientific Advisory Structure, as a member of the Science Evaluation Panel (2011-2014) and the United States Advisory Committee for Scientific Ocean Drilling (2014-2018).

Honors and recognition 
In 2006, Shevenell was awarded the Storrs Cole Memorial Research Award of the Geological Society of America for her publications on invertebrate micropaleontology.

Based upon her scientific ocean drilling research, Shevenell was selected as an IODP Distinguished Lecturer for 2014–2015. Lecturers are nominated by the scientific ocean drilling community and selected by the United States Science Support Office for ocean drilling. Distinguished lecturers visit institutions that are not typically involved in ocean drilling and may not have funds to host visiting speakers.

In 2016, Shevenell was recognized by American Geophysical Union (AGU) journal editors as an AGU Outstanding Reviewer for Geophysical Research Letters.

In 2019, Shevenell was elected as a Full Member of Sigma Xi, the scientific research honor society.

Her Nature paper, Gulick and Shevenell et al. was featured as a cover image by the journal and highlighted in its News and Views section.

Media coverage 
The significance of Shevenall's work to the understanding of changes affecting the Antarctic ice sheets have been featured in Discover Magazine, National Geographic, and  Reuters.

Her research is featured in an episode of the Forecast Podcast a podcast about climate science and climate scientists with Nature’s editor for climate science, Michael White.

Shevenell also maintains a blog for Antarctic research cruises on ice breaker Laurence Gould LMG12-11 (October, 2012); LMG13-11 (October 2013); icebreaker Nathaniel Palmer NBP14-02 (January–March, 2014), and IODP Expedition 374 (January–March, 2018).

Selected works

See also 

 Calcium carbonate compensation depth

References

External links 

 Women in Oceanography Profile of Amelia Shevenell; page 219
 University of Washington School of Oceanography
 IODP Distinguished Lecturer Overview of International Ocean Drilling lecturer program

Living people
American Antarctic scientists
University of California alumni
American geologists
American women geologists
Women Antarctic scientists
Year of birth missing (living people)
21st-century American women